Elisa Kadigia Bove is an Italian actress.

Personal life
Kadigia Bove is of Italian-Somali descent.

Bove is the mother of two boys, Malcolm and Massimiliano, both of whom were born in Sicily.

Career
Bove began her film career acting in commercials. She first gained renown during a television campaign for Atlantic, a popular 1970s TV-set brand. Daughter of an Italian soldier and a Somali woman. After attending the Piccolo Teatro directed by Strehler, she began a long career as an actress and vocalist, between theater, film and television. She interpreted many masterpieces by the Italian avant-garde composer Luigi Nono including A Floresta é Jovem e Cheja de Vida, Un volto del mare, Contrappunto dialettico alla mente, Y entonces Comprendió. She debuted as an actress in the first feature film directed by Valentino Orsini. She later starred in some B-Movies in the late Sixties and Eighties, while her last role was in a comedy directed by Cristina Comencini.

Bove later starred in a number of Italian feature films, particularly in the giallo horror genre. Of the latter, she appeared in the 1980 film Macabre by Lamberto Bava.

Besides cinematic work, Bove is the president of the Associazione Donne Immigrate Africane (ADIA), a non-profit organization serving immigrant women in Italy.

Filmography
Macabre (1980)
Occhio, malocchio, prezzemolo e finocchio (1983)

See also
Jonis Bashir
Italian Somalis

References

External links

Living people
Somalian actresses
20th-century Italian actresses
Italian people of Somali descent
People from Mogadishu
1942 births